Kamaʻāina ('child or person of the land') is a word describing Hawaii residents regardless of their racial background, as opposed to  which means a person of Native Hawaiian ancestry. A  may be considered to be someone who lives in Hawaii, or may be expanded to include people who once lived there but have moved away.

There is a statewide job placement program, founded in 1998 and sponsored by the Hawaii Island Economic Development Board, called "Kamaʻaina Come Home". The initiative is intended to increase the state's labor pool by inducing Hawaii college students and former residents who are now living in the continental United States to return to Hawaii. 

Many businesses in Hawaii offer a " rate," an often sizable discount given to local residents. These rates are offered primarily at restaurants, hotels, and tourist attractions. Merchants generally offer these " discounts" to anyone with a local ID, such as a Hawaii driver's license or local military ID.

See also

References

External links
 Kamaaina-careers.com, the website of the Kamaʻaina Come Home program

Hawaii culture
Hawaii society
Hawaiian words and phrases
Demonyms